This is a list of notable events in the history of LGBT rights that took place in the year 1974.

Events
 The city of Boulder, Colorado enacts an anti-discrimination ordinance that bars discrimination based on sexual preference. Following public outcry, the city council places a repeal measure up for a public vote, which results in the repeal of the ordinance.

January
 1 — The U.S. state of Ohio repeals state sodomy laws.
 11 — L'Association homophile de Montréal holds first meeting.
 15 — New York City theatre magazine After Dark bans the use of the word "gay" in advertisements.
 19 — The Gay Women's Collective holds two-day lesbian conference at Montreal's women's centre.

February
 11 — Richard North and Chris Vogel become first couple known to be married by the Unitarian Universalist Church. The Government of Canada refuses to recognize their marriage.

November
 5 — Elaine Noble becomes the first openly gay or lesbian individual to be elected to a state legislature in the U.S. when she is elected to the Massachusetts House of Representatives.

December
 9 — Allan Spear, a state senator in the U.S. state of Minnesota, comes out as gay.

See also

Timeline of LGBT history — timeline of events from 12,000 BCE to present
LGBT rights by country or territory — current legal status around the world
LGBT social movements

References

LGBT rights by year
1974 in LGBT history